Östen Warnerbring (22 November 1934 – 18 January 2006), also known as Östen med Rösten (lit. "Östen with the Voice"), was a Swedish singer, musician, composer and lyrics writer who mastered several musical genres. He started out as a jazz musician but over the years, he became known as a singer of other popular music, such as schlager music, and of Swedish poetry put into music by himself. In the 1970s, he became one of the first Swedish artists to use his native accent, of the province of Scania (Skåne) in the south of Sweden, also while singing.

Early life
Warnerbring was born in Malmö. His family lived near the race track Jägersro, and as a child, Warnerbring entertained the racing audience by playing the harmonica to them. During his childhood and as a young man he had a variety of jobs, working as a messenger boy at Sydsvenska Dagbladet, as a tinsmith for a local roofing company, as a salesman, as a manager at the record company Oktav, and as a journalist at Skånska Dagbladet. Eventually he had to choose between a career as a journalist or as a musician, and chose the latter. He lived most of his life in Skåne, in Skanör, Vellinge, Helsingborg and Malmö.

Career
Warnerbring's career started as a member of various orchestras playing at dances. His first record was released in 1952. His talents as a singer were discovered by Arne Domnérus in the mid-1950s, and in 1964 he started touring folkparks. His major breakthrough came in 1965, when he sang En röd blomma till en blond flicka, a Swedish version of Red Roses for a Blue Lady. He was a popular cabaret artist, and also performed in musicals and on television.

Warnerbring participated eleven times in Melodifestivalen, the Swedish qualifying competition of the Eurovision Song Contest. His first appearance was in the 1959 contest with the song Kungsgatans blues which finished in fourth place. In 1960, he sang Alla andra får varann; the song won, and was performed by Siw Malmkvist at the Eurovision finals in London. Warnerbring sang two songs in the 1962 contest. Lolo Lolita placed fourth and Trollen ska trivas sixth. In 1967, Warnebring won Melodifestivalen with Som en dröm, and performed the song at that year's finals in Vienna. His final appearance in Melodifestivalen was in 1974, when En mysig vals, written by himself, was placed tenth and last.

Later life
Warnerbring died in San Augustin, Canary Islands.

References

Further reading
Borg, Christer. 2015. Östen med rösten: sångare, musikant och underhållare. Malmö: Kira.

External links

Eurovision Song Contest entrants for Sweden
Eurovision Song Contest entrants of 1967
1934 births
2006 deaths
20th-century Swedish male singers
Singers from Malmö
Melodifestivalen contestants of 1959
Melodifestivalen contestants of 1960